Band-e Karim Khani (also Romanized as Band-e Karīm Khānī) is a village in Vardasht Rural District, in the Central District of Semirom County, Isfahan Province, Iran. At the 2006 census, its population was 24, in 4 families.

References 

Populated places in Semirom County